Call whisper, otherwise known as call screening, is a calling feature that often appears on non-geographic telephony systems and hosted inbound call handling software. It involves the playing of a message to the called party when they have answered a call, during which time the calling party continues to hear ringing. The called party can then decide whether to accept the call (usually by pressing a particular key whereupon the call will be put through to them) or to reject it (either by pressing a key or simply hanging up). They can also identify the caller by their caller ID number or answer the phone in an appropriate manner for the number that has been dialed.

Customization
The call whisper feature can be customized, depending on the options offered by the hosting product, in many ways:

The message played to the ‘called party’ can be customized to convey any relevant information that can be of assistance to the answering agent such as the number that has been dialed, a particular product for which the caller requires support, etc.
An element of dynamic content can be introduced to the recording so that it responds to the caller ID in an intelligent way e.g. it could simply read out the caller ID of the caller, it could specifically advise what location the call is coming from, based on the caller ID, or it could check the caller ID against a customer database and therefore advise the agent which customer is calling in and what their account number is.
The amount of time the system waits for the call to be accepted or rejected can be shortened or lengthened. This can be particularly useful if there is a possibility of an automated messaging service answering the call creating the need to prevent useless voicemail recordings of the call whisper message being left in the mailbox.

Advantages of using call whisper
Because call whisper settings are specific to a particular non-geographic telephone number, the feature can allow the called party to identify which telephone number the caller has dialed. For instance, ten separate numbers can all be routing their inbound calls to a single destination number. However, each of the ten numbers could have their own customized call whisper message on them relating to the nature of the call i.e. the function of the number that has been dialed. Therefore, the agent answering will know the number that has been dialed and thus the appropriate way to answer the call.

Whisper messages also allow businesses to identify the success of their marketing campaigns by being able to identify which campaign the phone number was assigned to; for example, different numbers can be assigned to billboard advertisements, online ads, printed brochures, and contact information on a website.

See also

Caller ID
Line hunting
Interactive voice response
Voicemail

References

Calling features